These are the Australian number-one albums of 2002, per the ARIA Charts.

See also
 2002 in music
 List of number-one singles in Australia in 2002

Notes
 Number of number one albums: 24
 Longest run at number one (during 2002): The Eminem Show by Eminem (7 weeks)

References

2002
2002 record charts
2002 in Australian music